Spurr may refer to:

 Spurr Township, Michigan
 Mount Spurr, a volcano in Alaska
 Spurr (crater), a lunar crater

People
 Arthur Clinton Spurr, American lawyer
 Josiah Edward Spurr, American geologist and explorer (eponym of the volcano and crater)
 Laura Spurr, Tribal Chairwoman, Nottawaseppi Huron Band of the Potawatomi
 Dr. Stephen Spurr, English public school headmaster
 Tommy Spurr, English football player
 Robert Spurr, rugby league footballer of the 1960s, 1970s and 1980s

See also
 Spur (disambiguation)